Events in the year 2017 in Denmark.

Incumbents
 Monarch – Margrethe II
 Prime Minister – Lars Løkke Rasmussen

Events
 20 March – Denmark makes the last payment on a $1.5 billion loan and thus becomes free of national debt in foreign currencies for the first time since 1834.
21 November – scheduled date for the 2017 Danish local elections

Culture

Architecture
 21 November – The Mærsk Tower wins the QAF Award in the Higher Education & Research - Completed Buildings category at the World Architecture Festival.

Film
 9 December – Claes Bang wins the award for Best Actor at the 30th European Film Awards.

Music
 3 December – The Fairest of Roses by Frederik Magle is premiered in Saint Paul's Church in Copenhagen on the occasion of the church's 140-years jubilee and rededication of the church tower.

Sports

Badminton
 17 February – Denmark wins the 2017 European Mixed Team Badminton Championships by defeating Russia 3–0 in the final.
 3–8 March – Mathias Boe and Carsten Mogensen wins gold in Men's Double at 2015 All England Super Series Premier.
 28 March-2 April – Viktor Axelsen wins Men's Single at 2017 India Open.
 25–30 April – With two gold medals, three silver medals and five bronze medals, Denmark finishes as the best nation at the 2017 European Badminton Championships.
 27 August – Viktor Axelsen wins gold in men's single at the 2017 BWF World Championships.

Cycling
 11 June – Jakob Fuglsang wins the Critérium du Dauphiné.
 2–6 August – 2017 European Road Championships takes place in Herning.
 17–24 September – With two gold medals, one silver medal and two bronze medals, Denmark finishes as the third best nation at the 2017 UCI Road World Championships in Norway.

Football
 14 November – Denmark qualifies for the 2018 FIFA World Cup by defeating Ireland 5–1 in the second leg of the play-off round of the 2018 FIFA World Cup qualification after playing 0–0 in the first match.
 7 December – F.C. Copenhagen qualifies for the round of 16 in the 2017–18 UEFA Europa League by defeating FC Sheriff Tiraspol in Group F.

Golf
 7 May – Lucas Bjerregaard and Thorbjørn Olesen wins GolfSixes.
 24 September – Lucas Bjerregaard wins Portugal Masters

Swimming
 13–17 December – The 2017 European Short Course Swimming Championships rakes place in Royal Arena in Copenhagen.

Other
 30 June - 7 July – Maja Alm wins a gold medal in Women's sprint and a silver medal in Women's long distance and Denmark wins a silver medal in Sprint relay at the 2017 World Orienteering Championships.

Deaths

20 January – Bruno Amoroso, economist (born 1936).
23 January – Erland Kolding Nielsen, Director General and CEO of The Danish Royal Library (born 1947).
26 January – Preben Dabelsteen, badminton player (born 1925).
13 February – Aage Birch, competitive sailor and Olympic silver medalist (born 1926).
 7 February – Svend Asmussen, jazz musician (born 1916)
 17 February – Erland Kops, badminton player (born 1937)
 13 May – Vibeke Sperling, journalist (born 1945)
3 June – Niels Helveg Petersen, politician (born 1939)
 4 December
 Thor Munkager, handballer (born 1951)
 Henning Jensen, footballer (born 1947)

See also
2017 in Danish television

References

 
Years of the 21st century in Denmark
Denmark
Denmark
2010s in Denmark